Pilsbryspira monilis is a species of small sea snail, a marine gastropod mollusk in the family Pseudomelatomidae.

Description
The length of the shell attains 12.5 mm.

Distribution
P. monilis can be found off the North American coastline, ranging from Texas to Florida.

References

 Bartsch, Paul, and Harald A. Rehder. "New turritid mollusks from Florida." Proceedings of the United States National Museum (1939)

External links
 
 Gastropods.com: Pilsbryspira monilis

monilis
Gastropods described in 1939